Rabbi Yehuda Chitrik (August 28, 1899 – February 14, 2006) was  an author and Mashpia in the Chabad Hasidic community in Brooklyn, New York.

Early life 

At the age of 14, he began studying in Yeshiva Tomchei Temimim in the village of Lyubavichi, where he met the fifth Chabad Rebbe, Rabbi Sholom Dovber Schneersohn. For the next 12 years, he traveled to many different communities together with the Yeshiva, for the difficulties caused by World War I, the Bolshevik revolution, and the economic pressures to which the Jews were subjected compelled the Yeshiva to move frequently.

In 1926 Chitrik married Kayla Tomarkin, the daughter of Rabbi Aharon Tomarkin, a Rabbi in Kharkiv, Ukraine, and began to serve as a Shochet until the Russian government forcefully shut down the ritual slaughterhouses. During this period he also met Rabbi Menachem Mendel Schneerson, who later became the seventh Lubavitcher rebbe.

Post-Holocaust 

In the turmoil that followed World War II and the Holocaust, Rabbi Chitrik and his family moved to Belgium with the intention of continuing to the United States. But the sixth Chabad Rebbe, Rabbi Yosef Yitzchok Schneersohn recognized his skills and asked him to remain in Belgium to support the community and spread Yiddishkeit and Chassidic warmth among the many refugees who had settled in that country.

In 1949, he emigrated to Montreal, Canada, where he was appointed Mashpia in the branch of the Lubavitcher Yeshiva established there. After the passing of his wife in 1983, he moved to Brooklyn.

Rabbi Chitrik was the eldest living Chabad Chassid for many years. He died 17 Shevat 5766. He has four children and eighteen grandchildren, and is survived by over 300 descendants in total.

Many of his descendants serve as spiritual leaders and rabbis across the globe. Amongst them is his son-in-law Rabbi David Moshe Lieberman, who serves as the chief rabbi of Antwerp, Belgium. His great grandsons, Rabbi Mendy Chitrik of Istanbul, Turkey serves as the Chairman of the Alliance of Rabbis in Islamic States. Other descendants serve in China, Turkey, Germany, Australia, Israel, Canada, Uruguay, Brazil, Ukraine, England and cities across the United States: Bedford, NY; Philadelphia, PA, New York City, NY; Munster, IN; Oak Park, MI.

Writings 
 Reshimot Devorim, four volumes.
 From My Father's Shabbos Table, A Treasury of Chabad Chassidic Stories

External links 
 A collection of stories by Yehudah Chitrik on Chabad.org
 Books 
 Rabbi Yehuda Chitrik, 106; Chasidic Storyteller  The Jewish Week 
 New York Times eulogy

Chabad-Lubavitch rabbis
Chabad-Lubavitch Mashpiim
Russian centenarians
Canadian centenarians
American centenarians
American people of Russian-Jewish descent
1899 births
2006 deaths
American Hasidic rabbis
Belarusian Jews
Men centenarians